Local Historic Landmark is a designation of the Cincinnati City Council for historic buildings and other sites in Cincinnati, Ohio, United States. Many of these landmarks are also listed on the National Register of Historic Places, providing federal tax support for preservation, and some are further designated National Historic Landmarks, providing additional federal oversight.

Criteria 
The Cincinnati City Council's Historic Conservation Board decides a building's historic significance. The structure must have at least one of the following attributes, as stated in the Cincinnati Municipal Code:

Structures that would not be given landmark designations, as stated in the Cincinnati Municipal Code, include:

Application process 
Historic districts, landmarks, and sites require filing of a designation application. This must be filed by the property owner or owner of a property in the area to be designated, or by the city council or its members, by the city council, city manager, city Urban Conservator, City Planning Commission, or by local preservation societies and community councils. After filing an application and during its nomination process, the site may not be demolished or evacuated.

Within 60 days of receiving the designation application, the city's Urban Conservator prepares and sends a report and guidelines for conservation to the city council's Historic Conservation Board. For historic districts, the Urban Conservator also sends a proposed boundary map, a list of all included structures, and a list of non-contributing structures.

The Historic Conservation Board schedules a public hearing to consider the landmark within 30 days of receiving the report and proposed guidelines. After the hearing, the board decides whether or not to recommend the designation, and forwards the decision and materials to the City Planning Commission. Within 30 days of the recommendation, the planning commission holds a public hearing to determine whether to follow the conservation board's recommendation. Afterward, the planning commission likewise forwards its decision and materials to the city council, which votes to ordain or overrule the planning commission's decision. If the planning commission approves of the designation, only a simple majority vote in the council is needed. However, if the planning commission does not approve of the designation, two-thirds of the council would need to vote in overruling the planning commission.

List of landmarks 
For consistency, the list below uses the name from the City of Cincinnati website.

Individual landmarks

Historic Districts 
For consistency, the list below uses the name from the City of Cincinnati website:

 Auburn Avenue Historic District (Mount Auburn)
 Betts–Longworth Historic District (West End)
 Cleinview-Hackberry Historic District (East Walnut Hills)
 College Hill Historic District (College Hill)
 Columbia Tusculum Historic District (Columbia-Tusculum)
 Court Street Historic District (CBD/Downtown)
 Dayton Street Historic District (West End)
 East Walnut Hills Historic District (East Walnut Hills)
 Holy Cross Monastery and Chapel Historic Site and Structure (Mount Adams)
 Hyde Park Observatory Historic District (Hyde Park)
 Lincoln-Melrose Historic District (Walnut Hills)
 Lytle Park Historic District (CBD/Downtown)
 Main Street Historic District (CBD/Downtown)
 Mohawk-Bellevue NBD Historic District (Over-the-Rhine)
 Ninth Street Historic District (CBD/Downtown)
 Northside NBD Historic District (Northside)
 Old Bond Hill Historic District (Bond Hill)
 Over-the-Rhine Historic District (Over-the-Rhine)
 Prospect Hill Historic District (Prospect Hill)
 Sacred Heart Academy Mt Storm Historic District (Clifton)
 Sohn-Mohawk Historic District (Over-the-Rhine)
 Third Main Street Historic District (CBD/Downtown)
 Uplands Historic District (East Walnut Hills)
 West Fourth Street Historic District (CBD/Downtown)
 Woodburn Avenue NBD Historic District (Woodburn)

See also 

National Register of Historic Places listings in downtown Cincinnati
National Register of Historic Places listings in eastern Cincinnati
National Register of Historic Places listings in western Cincinnati

References

External links 

 

Landmarks
Locally designated landmarks in the United States
Cincinnati Local Historic Landmarks